Ivan Trotski (born 27 May 1976 in Hrodna) is a Belarusian race walker.

Achievements

References
 
 

1976 births
Living people
Belarusian male racewalkers
Athletes (track and field) at the 2004 Summer Olympics
Athletes (track and field) at the 2008 Summer Olympics
Athletes (track and field) at the 2012 Summer Olympics
Athletes (track and field) at the 2016 Summer Olympics
Olympic athletes of Belarus
Sportspeople from Grodno